Physokentia thurstonii is a species of flowering plant in the family Arecaceae. It is found only in Fiji. It is threatened by habitat loss.

References

thurstonii
Endemic flora of Fiji
Near threatened plants
Taxa named by Odoardo Beccari
Taxonomy articles created by Polbot